The 20th Armoured Brigade Combat Team, previously the 20th Armoured Infantry Brigade, is an armoured infantry brigade formation of the British Army, currently headquartered at Wing Barracks, Bulford, Wiltshire, as part of the 3rd (United Kingdom) Division.

History
A 20th Light Armoured Brigade was formed in the Territorial Army in 1939. This was converted to a training formation in 1943.

Cold War 
On 15 September 1950, the 20th Armoured Brigade was reformed in the UK for a strategic reserve role. However, the brigade was moved to Münster, Germany in December 1951 to supplement the British contribution to NATO forces in Europe, where it again came under the command of 6th Armoured Division, this time as part of the British Army of the Rhine (BAOR).

The 1957 Defence White Paper announced the end of National Service, resulting in a number of reductions and changes across the armed forces. Part of this restructuring saw the disbandment of the 6th Armoured Division in April 1958. The Brigade survived as the new 20th Armoured Brigade Group, initially under the command of the 4th Infantry Division, and moved to Hobart Barracks, Detmold. It assumed the insignia of the old Division – the "Iron Fist" symbol that it wears to this day.

The pattern of life was determined by the BAOR training cycle and the demands of higher formation exercises as politicians and military commanders considered how best to face the threat of a Soviet invasion. Brigade troops frequently found themselves supporting multi-national NATO exercises, often working alongside the fledgling Bundeswehr (German Army). In October 1961, the Brigade participated in Exercise Spearpoint which was designed to demonstrate that the BAOR was able to conduct large-scale intensive operations under both conventional and nuclear conditions.

In September 1959, The Royal Corps of Signals reorganised all of their independent squadrons into a single numbering system from 200 upwards. This meant that when the Brigade's Signal Squadron adopted the title "200" in 1962 it automatically became the 'Senior Signal Squadron' in the British Army by precedence. Two years later it amalgamated with the brigade's Headquarters Squadron and took over responsibility for the administration and defence of the HQ. This combined role is still in place today and together the two separate units are designated as "20th Armoured Brigade Headquarters and Signal Squadron (200)".

On 22 June 1974, 20th Armoured Brigade and the German 21st Panzer Brigade, based in Augustdorf, held a partnership parade to emphasise the confidence and understanding that exists between the allied forces of the NATO countries.

BAOR experimented with a major restructuring towards the end of the 1970s as it reorganised into four divisions, each with two task force headquarters. These task forces could command any grouping of units from within their division and were designated sequentially Alpha through Hotel. As a result, on 1 December 1977, 20th Armoured Brigade was temporarily renamed "Task Force Hotel" under the command of the 4th Armoured Division. However, Task Force Hotel reverted to its brigade designation on 1 January 1980 and its units were realigned under the Brigade Headquarters.

Further unit rotations continued throughout this period with many famous regiments and battalions of the British Army converting to the armoured role to serve within the brigade. Typical were the Life Guards and the Blues and Royals, who served on a four-year rotational plan. As the Life Guards Regiment moved to BAOR, it became a Tank Regiment for the first time in its history, only to re-role as an infantry battalion in order to deploy on three separate operational tours of Northern Ireland.

Post-Cold War 
Following the fall of the Berlin Wall in November 1989 and the anticipated peace dividend at the end of the Cold War, the British government announced a series of cuts in defence spending under the 1990 "Options for Change" programme. As a result of the restructuring, in December 1992, the Brigade merged with the 33rd Armoured Brigade and moved its headquarters to Barker Barracks, Paderborn, where it came under the command of the 1st (UK) Armoured Division. By 1994, the overall troop strength in Germany had been halved and BAOR was replaced by British Forces Germany (BFG).Headquarters 20th Armoured Brigade, with some elements of the Brigade deployed to the former SFR Yugoslavia in April 1995 to take command of Sector South West under the United Nations mandate. Based at Gornji Vakuf in central Bosnia and Herzegovina, the commander was responsible for a large multi-national UN force as well as having responsibility for all forces in FRY. The end of the tour coincided with a declaration of peace and a shift in emphasis to a larger NATO force.

In October 1996, the Brigade returned to FRY as part of Multi-National Division (South-West). It was initially based at Šipovo, moving to Banja Luka in December 1996, whilst overseeing the transition from IFOR to SFOR and Operation RESOLUTE to Operation LODESTAR. The Brigade returned to Paderborn in April 1997.

In August 1999, the Brigade again deployed to Banja Luka on Operation PALATINE. It returned to Paderborn in December 1999, and moved to their current location in Antwerp Barracks, Sennelager on 20 August 2001.

Operation Telic (Iraq)
In October 2003, the Brigade first deployed to southern Iraq on Operation Telic 3, where it was based at Basra Palace. The Brigade's first two-months of the deployment was dominated by low-level battles against fanatical Fedayeen and foreign fighters infiltrating across the border with Iran who were actively supported by Iranian Al Quds forces, post-operational reports also mention former Ba'athist regime loyalists. Before their deployment, United Nations Security Council Resolution 1511 was passed, which set the basis for rebuilding Iraq and establishing security. The aim was to eventually transfer authority from the Coalition Provisional Authority to an Iraqi Transitional National Assembly. The middle two months of the Brigade's tour was dominated by security sector reform, to achieve this aim meant the building of capacity in the Iraqi Security Forces (especially the paramilitary Iraqi Civil Defence Corps and police) and civilian Iraqi institutions. Security sector reform would remain an objective for the rest of the tour. The final two months of Operation Telic 3 were dominated by high-intensity operations against resurgent Shia militias (notably the Jaish al Mahdi (JAM).

20th Armoured Brigade was awarded the Freedom of the City of Paderborn by the town council on 28 May 2005. The right to exercise the freedom was presented "as a contribution for consolidation of the Anglo-German friendship, the joint solidarity in NATO and a further element for the building of the joint house Europe".

The Brigade returned to southern Iraq again in April 2006 during Operation TELIC 8, and was situated in Basra, Al Amarah and Al Muthanna Provinces. During the seven month summer tour, the troops contributed to the successful handover of security in two of the four Iraqi Provinces within the Multinational Division (South East) [MND(SE)].

The Iron Fist returned to Basra for a third time in 2008 for Operation TELIC 13. It became the last British brigade to serve in Iraq at the end of the UK's 6-year combat mission in the country on 30 April 2009.

Operation Herrick (Afghanistan)
20th Armoured Brigade took over command of Task Force Helmand in Afghanistan from 3 Commando Brigade Royal Marines on 9 October 2011, officially marking the start of Operation Herrick 15.

Future
Under the Army's new 2020 structure, in January 2015 the Brigade was retitled to 20th Armoured Infantry Brigade incorporating three armoured infantry battle groups. In 2016 the Brigade began its high readiness training in preparation for becoming NATO's lead for the Very High Readiness Joint Task Force Land [VJTF(L)] in 2017.

The Brigade Headquarters moved to Wing Barracks, Bulford, in 2019.

Under the Future Soldier programme, the brigade has been redesignated as the 20th Armoured Brigade Combat Team, and in the future will control a reconnaissance regiment equipped with the General Dynamics Ajax.  The current armoured regiment (QRH) will be re-equipped with the Challenger 3 MBT and the armoured infantry battalions with the Warrior IFV re-equipped with the Boxer AFV.

Structure
The brigade is based at Bulford Camp. It will form as part of the Reaction Force.

The current organisation of the brigade under the Defence in a Competitive Age is:

 20th Armoured Infantry Brigade Headquarters, at Wing Barracks, Bulford Camp
 Royal Dragoon Guards, in Warminster (Armoured Cavalry)
 Queen's Royal Hussars, at Assaye Barracks, Tidworth Camp (Armoured)
 1st Battalion, Royal Regiment of Fusiliers, at Mooltan Barrack, Tidworth Camp (Armoured Infantry)
 5th Battalion, The Rifles, at Ward Barracks, Bulford Garrison (Armoured Infantry)
 5th Battalion, Royal Regiment of Fusiliers, in Newcastle upon Tyne (Army Reserve – Armoured Infantry, paired with 1 R Fusiliers)
 7th Battalion, The Rifles, in Reading (Army Reserve – Armoured Infantry, paired with 5 Rifles)
 3 Armoured Close Support Battalion, Royal Electrical and Mechanical Engineers, in Tidworth (Armoured Close Support)

Alliances 
  Germany - Panzerbrigade 21 (21st Panzer Brigade)

Brigade commanders
Recent commanders have included:

 1954–1956 Brigadier John Hackett
 1958–1961 Brigadier James d'Avigdor-Goldsmid
 1963–1965 Brigadier Richard Ward
 1965–1968 Brigadier Patrick Howard-Dobson
 1969–1970 Brigadier John Stanier
 1972–1973 Brigadier Richard Lawson
 1973–1975 Brigadier Maurice Johnston
 1978–1979 Brigadier Bernard Gordon Lennox
 1979–1981 Brigadier John Stibbon
 1985-1987 Brigadier Michael Regan
 1987–1989 Brigadier Michael Walker
 1992–1994 Brigadier Arthur Denaro
 1994–1996 Brigadier Andrew Pringle
 1996–1997 Brigadier David Leakey
 1997–1999 Brigadier Nick Parker
 1999–2001 Brigadier Jeffrey Cook
 2001–2004 Brigadier David Rutherford-Jones
 2004–2005 Brigadier Nick Carter
 2005–2007 Brigadier James Everard
 2007–2009 Brigadier Tom Beckett
 2009–2012 Brigadier Patrick Sanders
 2012–2014 Brigadier James Swift
 2014–2016 Brigadier Ian Mortimer
 2016–2018 Brigadier Michael Elviss
 2018–2020 Brigadier Dominic Biddick
 2020–2021 Brigadier Patrick Ginn
 2021–Present Brigadier Carl Boswell

See also

 Sennelager Training Area

Notes

References

External links

 Official British Army website of 20th Armoured Infantry Brigade (The Iron Fist)
BAOR locations
British Army Locations from 1945

20
Military units and formations established in 1950
Military units and formations disestablished in 1977
Military units and formations established in 1980
Future Soldier